Brandenburg-Northeast is a NUTS-2 Regions of Germany, encompassing the northeastern portion of the state of Brandenburg.

References

Brandenburg
NUTS 2 statistical regions of Germany